The Russian Academy of Engineering (RAE) is a public academy of sciences, which unites leading Russian and foreign scientists, engineers, scientific-research organizations, higher educational institutions and enterprises. Among the full members of the Academy are the persons who enriched the science with outstanding achievements or practically implemented works of high scientific-technical significance in the area of engineering, who made their great personal contribution into organizing one of branches of industry, science, technics and technology.

The Russian Academy of Engineering is the legal successor of the Engineering Academy of the USSR.

Mission of the Academy 
 uniting creative potential of Russian scientists and engineers;
 development and efficient implementation of intellectual potential in the field of engineering activities;
 development and accompanying in carrying out the most important and prospective research and innovation programmes;
 creation and application of principally new types of technics, technologies and materials;
 providing acceleration of scientific-technical progress on the key directions of development of the Russian economy.

Activity 
The Russian Academy of Engineering includes 28 sections, which cover the key branches of industry, and a range of councils on various scientific-technical issues. The regional structure of the Academy is represented by 38 regional departments and by 7 centres.

Periodicals of the Academy 
The Academy is the founder of 23 branch and regional magazines and newspapers. The most famous periodicals are:
 “Construction materials, equipment and technologies of XXIst century”, a magazine;
 “Business glory of Russia”, an intersectoral almanac;
 “Chemical and oil and gas engineering»,  a magazine;
 «Information society», a magazine;
 «Aerospace technics and technology»;
 «Arms. Politics. Conversion»;
 «Industry», a newspaper (in cooperation with the International Union of scientific and engineering public associations).

Members of the Academy 
The Academy involves over thousand individual members from 40 countries of the world. Among the member societies of the Academy is about 700 major Russian enterprises, scientific-research and higher educational institutions, including “Kamaz”, “AvtoVAZ”, “GAZ”, “Uralmash”, “Gazprom”, FGUP “Admiralteyskie verfi”, “Baltiysky zavod”, GMK “Norilsky Nikel”, Novolipetsky metallurgical works, “Izhstal” (part of “Mechel”), OAO “Rosvertol”, AK “Alrosa” and others.

The president of the RAE, since the day of its foundation, is Boris Vladimirovich Gusev, corresponding member of the Russian Academy of Sciences (RAS).

Note 
 The Russian Academy of Engineering is not to be confused with the A.M. Prokhorov Academy of Engineering Sciences (President, academician Yu.V. Gulyaev)

External links
 Engineeracademy.ru
 RAE-info - Official Website
 Engineeracademy.org

Russian National Academies
National academies of engineering